Finn Florijn (born 29 November 1999) is a Dutch rower. He competed in the heats of the 2020 Summer Olympics, but had to withdraw before the repechage because he had contracted COVID-19.

References

1999 births
Living people
Dutch male rowers
Olympic rowers of the Netherlands
Rowers at the 2020 Summer Olympics
Rowers from Amsterdam
Sportspeople from Leiden
20th-century Dutch people
21st-century Dutch people